Hopkins Family Cemetery is a historic family cemetery located near Hopkins, Richland County, South Carolina. It was established about 1775, on the Back Swamp Plantation. A wall and stile were built about 1835–1837. It contains 69 marked graves of the Hopkins and related families.

It was added to the National Register of Historic Places in 2010.

References

External links
 

Cemeteries on the National Register of Historic Places in South Carolina
1775 establishments in South Carolina
Buildings and structures in Richland County, South Carolina
National Register of Historic Places in Richland County, South Carolina